Rameez Junaid and Frank Moser were the defending champions, but decided not to participate.

Sanchai Ratiwatana and Sonchat Ratiwatana won the final by defeating Purav Raja and Divij Sharan 6–4, 7–6(7–3).

Seeds

Draw

Draw

References
 Main Draw

Samsung Securities Cup - Doubles
2011 Men's Doubles